Pipedown was an American hardcore punk band from Northern California, United States, with radical leftist lyrics.  Starting in Grass Valley, California in 1997, their lyrics are often reminiscent of eco-anarchism, especially since they recommended readings such as the Unabomber manifesto and Deep Ecology for the 21st Century (George Sessions) on their first album Enemies of Progress. In 2003, Pipedown released Mental Weaponry, again on A-F Records. Over the course of this group's lifetime, Pipedown took part in over five full U.S. tours and two European tours spanning eight countries; sharing stages with the bands: Anti-Flag, Thrice, The Bouncing Souls, Darkest Hour, The Lawrence Arms, Tsunami Bomb, etc. On July 13, 2005, A-F Records announced Pipedown's breakup.  Currently, some of the members can be found playing in various bands, such as Ean Elliot Clevenger in Creux Lies and James K. in ÆQUOREA.

Members 
Ean Elliot Clevenger (Vocals)
Jayoh (Guitar)
James K. (Guitar)
Jack Jeffries (Drums)
Jaycen McKissick (Bass)

Past members 
Doug Wellmon (Bass 2001–2004)
Ryan Pfannenstein (Bass 1998–2001)
Jonah Nishihira (Bass 1998)
Shahn Riley (Bass 1997–1998)
Josh White (Drums 1997–2000)

Discography 
Enemies of Progress (2001) (A-F Records)
Mental Weaponry (2003) (A-F Records)

External links
A-F Records' Website

Hardcore punk groups from California
A-F Records artists